Phil Thompson (born 1991) is an American politician serving as a member of the Iowa House of Representatives from the 48th. Elected in November 2018, he assumed office on January 14, 2019.

Early life and education 
Thompson was born in Jefferson, Iowa in 1991. After graduating from Jefferson-Scranton High School, he enlisted in the U.S. Army. He also studied systems engineering at the United States Military Academy for two years.

Career 
Thompson served as an infantry officer in the United States Army during the Iraq War. He later returned to Iowa and joined the Iowa National Guard. He also worked as a field representative for the National Rifle Association Institute for Legislative Action. He also served as an assistant for State Representative Dawn Pettengill. He was elected to the Iowa House of Representatives in November 2018 and assumed office on January 14, 2019.

References 

1991 births
Living people
People from Jefferson, Iowa
Republican Party members of the Iowa House of Representatives